Tsiba Moukassa is a Congolese professional footballer who plays as a midfielder for AC Léopards.

International career
In January 2014, coach Claude Leroy, invited him to be a part of the Congo squad for the 2014 African Nations Championship. The team was eliminated in the group stages after losing to Ghana, drawing with Libya and defeating Ethiopia.

References

Living people
Republic of the Congo footballers
2014 African Nations Championship players
Republic of the Congo A' international footballers
AC Léopards players
1992 births

Association football midfielders